The Molecular Medicine Partnership Unit is an alliance between the European Molecular Biology Laboratory and the Medical Faculty of the University of Heidelberg. Its primary aim is to uncover the molecular basis of disease and to speed the transformation of biomedical discoveries into personalized medicine strategies.

Founded in 2002, the Molecular Medicine Partnership Unit (MMPU) comprises eight inter-disciplinary research teams. It is co-directed by Prof. Andreas Kulozik from the Angelika-Lautenschläger Hospital for Children and Adolescents at the University of Heidelberg, by Prof. Matthias Hentze and Dr. Wolfgang Huber from the European Molecular Biology Laboratory, and is housed in the Otto-Meyerhof-Research Center on the Medical Campus of the University of Heidelberg, Germany.

Research themes 
Research themes place emphasis on common diseases as well as on rare diseases with a particular medical need.

In 2023 more than 100 international scientists work on the following eight research themes:
‘Diseases of mRNA metabolism’, headed by Andreas Kulozik and Matthias Hentze
‘Iron homeostasis in health and disease’, headed by Martina Muckenthaler and Matthias Hentze.
‘Chronic Pain and Homeostasis’ headed by Rohini Kuner, Theodore Alexandrov, Robert Prevedel and Jan Siemens.
‘Molecular Pediatric Oncology’ headed by Jan Korbel and Andreas Kulozik.
‘Systems Medicine of Cancer Drugs’ headed by Sascha Dietrich, Wolfgang Huber and Junyan Lu.
‘Stem Cell–Niche Networks in Ageing and Disease’ headed by Caroline Pabst, Judith Zaugg, Anthony D. Ho and Carsten Müller–Tidow.
‘Chronic Kidney Diseases’ headed by Rainer Pepperkok, Julio Saez-Rodriguez and Matias Simons.
‘Heart Development and Diseases’ headed by Eileen Furlong and Johannes Backs.

Selected recent publications

References 
Rhein-Neckar-Zeitung/Nr. 22, "Gemeinsam für eine molekulare Medizin", 28.01.2011: 
European Molecular Biology Laboratory newsletter article on the development of science at the Molecular Medicine Partnership Unit, February 2006: https://web.archive.org/web/20110929214922/http://www.embl.de/mmpu/mmpu/history/hist_feb06_pdf.pdf
European Molecular Biology Laboratory and University of Heidelberg Press Release on the second phase of the Molecular Medicine Partnership Unit, 18.07.2005: https://web.archive.org/web/20110929214743/http://www.embl.de/mmpu/mmpu/history/hist_jul05_pdf.pdf
Nature, vol. 423, 15 May 2003, "The Muenster match": https://web.archive.org/web/20110929215108/http://www.embl.de/mmpu/mmpu/history/muenster_match_nature_pdf.pdf
European Molecular Biology Laboratory Press Release on the establishment of the Molecular Medicine Partnership Unit, 25.01.2002: https://web.archive.org/web/20110929214603/http://www.embl.de/mmpu/mmpu/history/hist_jan02_pdf.pdf

External links 
Molecular Medicine Partnership Unit page at the European Molecular Biology Laboratory
Molecular Medicine Partnership Unit page at the University Medical Center

Heidelberg University
International research institutes
Molecular biology institutes
Medical research institutes in Germany
Medical and health organisations based in Baden-Württemberg